The Brabova is a right tributary of the river Merețel in Romania. It discharges into the Merețel near Sârsca.

References

Rivers of Romania
Rivers of Dolj County